State Route 770 (SR 770, OH 770) is a north–south state highway in the southern portion of the U.S. state of Ohio. The southern terminus of State Route 770 is at State Route 247 in Seaman.

Route description
State Route 770 is located entirely within the northern portion of Adams County.  The route is not incorporated as a part of the National Highway System.

History
1937 marked the year in which State Route 770 made its debut. Heading west-to-east through the original southern terminus in 1937 was the former State Route 74, State Route 32's predecessor. By 1981, with the completion of the new four-lane divided highway stretch of State Route 32 south of Seaman, the former stretch of two-lane State Route 32 between State Route 770's former southern terminus and State Route 247 in Seaman became an extension of State Route 770.

Major intersections

References

770
Transportation in Adams County, Ohio